Graham Frederick Cross (born 15 November 1943) is a former professional footballer and cricketer. He is the record appearance holder for Leicester City, making 599 appearances for the club in all competitions.

Football career
Cross was born in Leicester. He spent most of his career playing for Leicester City originally as an inside forward, then later as a centre-half and occasionally a right half. At Leicester he holds the record for the most appearances for the club with 599 between 1961 and 1975. He went on to join Brighton & Hove Albion and then Preston North End. He made the record number of appearances for the England Under 23 side but never made a full international appearance.

Cricket career
Cross also represented Leicestershire as a right-handed batsman and a right-arm medium-fast bowler between 1961 and 1977. In 83 first-class matches, he scored 2,079 runs (average 18.39), highest score 78 with eight fifties and 61 catches. He took 92 wickets (average 29.95), best bowling 4/28. In 51 ListA matches, he scored 701 runs (average 20.61), highest score 57* with three fifties and 17 catches. He took 63 wickets (average 20.23), best bowling 4/11.

Appearing irregularly because of his football commitments, Cross was nevertheless a good enough player to find a place in Ray Illingworth's successful county side of the late '70s. Cross's last appearance came when the side was stricken by illness in May 1977. A scratch side had to be assembled to play Hampshire at Grace Road in the B&H Cup. Showing his habitual adaptability, he kept wicket for the only time during his career.

Honours

As a player
Leicester City
 FA Cup runner-up: 1963, 1969
 League Cup: 1964
 League Cup runner-up: 1965
 Second Division: 1970–71
 1971 FA Charity Shield

Leicestershire County Cricket Club
 Benson and Hedges Cup: 1975

Records
Leicester City all-time leading appearance maker: 599 games
Leicester City all-time leading appearance maker in the first tier (Premier League and predecessors): 414 games
Leicester City all-time leading appearance maker in the FA Cup: 59 games
Leicester City all-time leading appearance maker in the League Cup: 40 games (Joint record)

References

External links
 Cricket Archive
Famous players - Graham Cross
Football Heroes - Graham Cross
Profile and stats at FoxesTalk
Lincoln City profile

Further reading

Living people
1943 births
English cricketers
Leicestershire cricketers
Cricketers from Leicester
English footballers
Footballers from Leicester
Association football defenders
Association football midfielders
England under-23 international footballers
FA Cup Final players
Brighton & Hove Albion F.C. players
Leicester City F.C. players
Chesterfield F.C. players
Preston North End F.C. players
Lincoln City F.C. players